Senator Spooner may refer to:

John Coit Spooner (1843–1919), U.S. Senator from Wisconsin
Wyman Spooner (1795–1877), Wisconsin State Senator